Sunday is a 2008 Indian Hindi-language mystery comedy film directed by Rohit Shetty. The film stars Ajay Devgan, Ayesha Takia, Arshad Warsi and Irrfan Khan in lead roles. It is a remake of the 2005 Telugu film Anukokunda Oka Roju.

Sunday released on 25 January 2008, and received mixed response from critics. It also managed to do average business at the box office worldwide.

Plot
The story takes place in the city of Delhi. The film begins when a girl is murdered by an unseen killer. It is learnt that the killer was her fiance & had acquired evidence about her infidelity. Then, the story shifts to life of Sehar (Ayesha Takia), a voiceover artist. Sehar, who lives alone in a flat, has a friend named Ritu (Anjana Sukhani), who is a fashion designer. Sehar has a rare disorder - her memory blanks out, leaving her clueless about events that took place in a certain time period. Hence, she rarely socialises. But Ritu forcefully takes her to a nightclub.

Sehar had previously met ACP Rajveer Randhawa (Ajay Devgn), a corrupt cop. Unknown to both, their mothers are old friends and want them to get married. Sehar has rejected Rajveer after knowing his truth, but he is smitten. Here, Sehar wakes up in her flat and apparently nothing wrong has happened. But she soon learns that she has missed one whole day. Also, she is being followed by a stranger (Murli Sharma). She runs into two characters, Ballu (Arshad Warsi), a taxi driver asking her a trip fare about which she knows nothing & Kumar (Irrfan Khan), a wannabe actor, who mistakes her for a ghost.

But the plot thickens when Sehar hears some suspicious messages on her answering machine, making her realise that something sinister has happened during the missing Sunday, the day she recalls nothing about. Rajveer comes to rescue, but he comes to the same conclusion as hers. Tests show that Sehar was roofied - most probably in the night club, causing the whole problem. Ballu & Kumar turn out to be red herrings.

Rajveer finds the boys who roofied Sehar, but nothing concrete is found. Just as he is about to accept that Sehar might have killed someone, Sehar is attacked by some goons. The goons fail to kill her, but Rajveer realises that Sehar might have witnessed a murder. After reconstructing the events at the night out with Ritu, Rajveer finds out that Ballu had left her near a place where a youth was murdered.

Rajveer realises the implications and sets a trap for the goons. With help of Ballu & Kumar, the goons are finally nabbed & Rajveer learns the truth. He arrests the son of Khurana, a minister, for a double murder. An enraged Khurana demands an explanation. It is revealed that the girl murdered earlier was killed by Khurana's son. After killing her, he waited for few days before killing his own friend, with whom the girl was cheating him. Unfortunately, Sehar was left nearby by Ballu. Khurana's son assumed that she saw the second murder, hence he sent the goons to kill her.

Khurana's son protests until brought face to face with the goons. Khurana has his son arrested. With Sehar safe, the people are still clueless about Sehar's stalker - until the stalker shows up himself. He reveals himself to be a taxi driver. It is revealed that after Khurana's son had seen Sehar, it was this taxi driver who saw Sehar. He realised that she was drugged and managed to get her back to her flat after finding her address. With this final mystery solved, Kumar narrates what happened with everybody, Rajveer and Sehar got married, Ballu now owns a car company, owning hundreds of cars and trucks, and Kumar has become a Bhojpuri superstar, showing that the story ended on a happy note.

Cast
 Ajay Devgan as ACP Rajveer Randhava
 Ayesha Takia as Sehar Thapar
 Arshad Warsi as Ballu
 Irrfan Khan as Kumar Mangat
 Mukesh Tiwari as Inspector Anwar Rehman
 Vrajesh Hirjee as Chakki - Martial Arts Instructor
 Murli Sharma as the Mysterious Stalker
 Anjana Sukhani as Ritu Hirani
 Ali Asgar as Amit Khurana
 Deepak Qazir as Raj Khurana
 Manoj Chandila as Sanjay
 Shereveer Vakil as Aseem Bajaj
 Tusshar Kapoor Special appearance in song "Manzar"
 Esha Deol Special appearance in song "Kashmakash"
 Robin Bhatt as Doctor
 Farid Amiri as Pardunam 'P.O.K.' Om Kumar
 Gulshan Rana as Vatsal Seth
 Ravi Gossain as Hiren Shetty
 Swapnil Kotriwar as Journalist

Production

The shooting began from 10 March 2007, the first few days of shooting happened in Mumbai and then a 30 days schedule in Delhi from 18 March. The second and last schedule started from 22 May 2007 in Delhi and then continued in Mumbai and later in Hyderabad. Lastly, a song was shot in Australia and the shooting was completed by 13 July 2007.

The film was shot at popular places in India like Pragati Maidan, Lal Qila, India Gate, Connaught Place.

Trivia

 Arshad Warsi has the same name spelling that he had in Tere Mere Sapne. (Ballu)

Soundtrack

Reception
The film received mixed reviews and many bashed the film for not including elements that made the original a success. It was also an "average" performer at the box office.

References

External links
Sunday Official Site

2008 films
2000s Hindi-language films
Films scored by Shibani Kashyap
Films scored by Sandeep Chowta
Films scored by Daler Mehndi
Films scored by Raghav Sachar
Hindi remakes of Telugu films
2000s mystery thriller films
2000s comedy mystery films
2000s comedy thriller films
Indian comedy thriller films
Indian mystery thriller films
Indian comedy mystery films
Films directed by Rohit Shetty
2000s masala films
2008 comedy films